Leonetto Cappiello (9 April 1875  – 2 February 1942) was an Italian and French poster art designer and painter, who mainly lived and worked in Paris. He is now often called 'the father of modern advertising' because of his innovation in poster design.  The early advertising poster was characterized by a painterly quality as evidenced by early poster artists Jules Chéret, Alfred Choubrac and Hugo D'Alesi.  Cappiello, like other young artists, worked in a way that was almost the opposite of his predecessors. He was the first poster artist to use bold figures popping out of black backgrounds, a startling contrast to the posters early norm.

Biography
He was born in Livorno in Tuscany. He would die in Cannes in France.
Cappiello had no formal training in art.  The first exhibition of his work was in 1892, when a painting was displayed at the municipal museum in Florence. Some of his paintings are on display in the Museo Civico Giovanni Fattori in Livorno.

Caricatures
Cappiello started his career as a caricaturist illustrating in journals like Le Rire, Le Cri de Paris, Le Sourire, L'Assiette au Beurre, La Baionnette, Femina, and others.  His first album of caricatures, Lanterna Magica, was made in 1896.  In 1898, he moved to Paris, and his caricatures were published in Le Rire for the first time.

In 1902, a 24-page book of his caricatures was published entitled Gens du Monde 'people of high society' for the magazine L'Assiette au Beurre. The following year, a 38-page book entitled Le Théâtre de Cappiello 'The theatre of Cappiello' was published for a special issue of Le Théâtre magazine, with captions written by theatre critics. In 1904, his work was reviewed along with that of Sem and Carlo de Fornaro.

Cappiello began to move away from caricature work favouring posters. In 1905 a final publication 70 Dessins de Cappiello '70 drawings by Cappiello' by H. Floury, included black and white lithographic prints, as well as a handful of colour images produce by the process of pochoir. The technique was popular at the time as a way of adding colour to an image relatively cheaply, and would involve colour being hand painted onto an image with stencils.

Cappiello made his name during the poster boom period in the early 20th century, with designs markedly different from premier poster artist Jules Chéret. His first poster, for the newspaper Frou-Frou, was made in 1899.

Vercasson
Cappiello’s career as a poster artist began in earnest in 1900 when he began a contract with the printer Pierre Vercasson. In this period, the printers would act as an agent for artists and commission work to them. Vercasson had a print house, and his goal was to bring vibrancy and colour to the streets of Paris, he wanted the posters that he produced to stand out from the rest and attract lucrative new advertisers to his agency. Of course living in Paris, he was aware of the current art scene, and had seen many examples of Cappiello’s work, including a small number of posters already produced and in particular those for Le Frou-Frou. He knew that Cappiello had the potential to be exactly what he was looking for. The relationship commenced with the arrangement that Vercasson would find the clients and brief Cappiello on the product. It was then up to Cappiello to produce a sketch for the client for which he would receive the fee of 500 francs, a good amount at the time. Once the design had been approved by the client a full size design would be produced for the poster at a size of 1x1.4m, an old French paper standard known as the Double Grand Aigle. Cappiello would also be responsible for ensuring the successful transfer of the design onto lithographic stone ready for printing.

He was married to Suzanne Meyer Cappiello in 1901 and his brother Oreste was married to Camille, sister of the painter Alfredo Müller.

Between 1901 and 1914, he created several hundred posters in a style that revolutionised the art of poster design.  Cappiello redesigned the fin-de-siècle pictures into images more relevant to the faster pace of the 20th century. During this period, Cappiello continued as a caricaturist. During World War I, Cappiello worked as an interpreter in Italy.

Devambez
After the First World War Cappiello returned to producing posters. His first meeting with Devambez in 1918 marked the start of a long discussion: three years later he signed an exclusive contract with the Paris publisher for whom he designed now famous icons: such as Kub, Campari, Parapluie Revel, Pirelli, Chocolat Klaus and Poudre de Luzy, and the famous entertainer Mistinguett at the Casino de Paris. Unlike Vercasson, Devambez did not have its own print house, and had the posters printed at a number of large printers. The agency concentrated on finding new clients from across Europe, and successfully spread Cappiello’s celebrated works across the continent. He remained with the agency until 1936.

Legacy

Over the course of his career Cappiello produced more than 530 advertising posters.  Today, his original posters are still collected, sold at auction and by dealers around the world.

Selected lithographs

See also
 Poster

References

External links
 Leonetto Cappiello: Father of the Modern Poster
 Cappiello.fr
 Cappiello Poster Reproductions
 Leonetto Cappiello Originals for Sale
 

1875 births
1942 deaths
Italian illustrators
19th-century Italian painters
20th-century Italian painters
20th-century Italian male artists
Italian poster artists
People from Livorno
Italian expatriates in France
19th-century Italian male artists